Criss Angel BeLIEve is a show that aired on Spike. It debuted on October 8, 2013, and is stylized much like Angel's previous show Mindfreak that aired on A&E. The show gives viewers unprecedented access into Angel's "Think Tank" and shows the creative process behind the illusions and demonstrations from conception to execution. It is centered on stunts and street magic acts by magician Criss Angel. Originally, 11 episodes were set to air, but only 10 were shown due to a surgery on Angel that was deemed necessary after he suffered a severe shoulder injury from his "Double Straight Jacket" escape.

Episodes

See also
List of Criss Angel Mindfreak episodes

References

External links
 

2013 American television series debuts
2013 American television series endings
2010s American reality television series
Spike (TV network) original programming
Television shows set in the Las Vegas Valley
English-language television shows
American television magic shows